The Vilna Shul is now a historic landmark building housing a cultural center, community center, and living museum.  It was a synagogue and was built for an Orthodox congregation in 1919 by immigrants primarily from Vilna, Lithuania.  The building stands on what is known as the back side or north slope of Beacon Hill in Boston, Massachusetts.

The front of the Hill has always been filled with stately homes and faces the Boston Common. The back of the Hill was the early residence of Boston's black community and, later, of a series of immigrant communities.  In the first half of the 20th century, there were dozens of immigrant synagogues in this area and over 50 in the city of Boston proper.  By the 1980s, the Jewish community had almost entirely left the neighborhood and the building was all but abandoned.  An argument broke about whether the synagogue should be sold and the proceeds given to another congregation, turned into a community center for the residents of the neighborhood, or preserved as a monument or museum to the immigrant generations of Jews.

The synagogue was designed by Boston architect Max Kalman, but the Shul is not noteworthy for its architecture, according to  Stanley Smith, then executive director of Historic Boston Inc., a nonprofit group that recommended preserving the old synagogue. It's not high style, not one of the great monuments of architecture that you would travel miles to see. It's like many of the early meetinghouses and churches that are highly representative of the immigrants who built them.

According to the American Jewish Historical Society, there is "no record of any important event ever taking place at that congregation," which was one of many modest synagogues built by Jewish immigrants. The Vilna Shul is, however, the last of the purpose-built immigrant synagogues still standing in downtown Boston at the end of the 20th century.  It therefore represents the oldest Jewish building within the city limits whose entire history has been devoted to activities of Jewish faith and culture.  The Vilna Shul is also noteworthy as one of only two extant free-standing buildings on the north slope of Beacon Hill. It represents a physical, colorful, and rich part of Boston's history and built heritage.

The Vilna Center for Jewish Heritage was founded to raise funds to preserve and restore the synagogue for use as a Jewish cultural heritage center.  This 501(c)(3) corporation is now The Vilna Shul, Boston's Center for Jewish Culture, Inc.

Three million dollars were spent on the architectural restoration of the synagogue building, which now houses a small exhibit on the history of the synagogue and of the history of Boston's Jewish community.  The building opens certain weekdays and weekends is a regular part of the Beacon Hill and Boston tourist circuit.  Besides being a historic, cultural, and community site, It serves as a location for regular Jewish religious services including major holidays, young family Shabbats, and is the home of Havurah on the Hill.

References

External links 
 Official website

Ashkenazi Jewish culture in Massachusetts
Ethnic museums in Massachusetts
Jewish museums in the United States
Lithuanian-American culture in Massachusetts
Lithuanian-Jewish culture in the United States
Museums in Boston
Orthodox synagogues in Massachusetts
Synagogues in Boston
Synagogues preserved as museums
Beacon Hill, Boston
Synagogues completed in 1919